Scythris sinensis is a moth of the family Scythrididae first described by the Austrian entomologists Baron Cajetan von Felder and Alois Friedrich Rogenhofer in 1875. The moth is found in Asia, Europe and North America.

Description
The wingspan is 10–14 mm. The forewings are blue-blackish and the hindwings are dark fuscous. The larvae feed on goosefoot (Chenopodium album) and common orache (Atriplex patula).

Distribution
The moth is known from the Far East and has been found in eastern Europe in recent years, probably as accidental introductions. It is also found in central Russia, southern Siberia and Pennsylvania in North America. In Great Britain the moth is only known from two specimens discovered in a shop in Kent in 1980. They were probably accidentally imported.

References

sinensis
Moths described in 1875
Moths of Asia
Moths of Europe
Moths of North America
Taxa named by Baron Cajetan von Felder
Taxa named by Alois Friedrich Rogenhofer